Francis Anthony "Eg" White (born 22 November 1966) is a British musician, songwriter and producer. He started his career in the cowpunk band Yip Yip Coyote in the 1980s and then formed Brother Beyond with his brother, David White, in the late 1980s.
In 1990, Eg White recorded the pop album 24 Years of Hunger, and then in 1992 he produced the debut, self-titled album by Kinky Machine. He turned to songwriting in 1997, winning the Ivor Novello Award for Best Song Musically and Lyrically in 2004. In 2008 White worked with Adele on three tracks. In 2009 White was awarded his second Ivor Novello Award for 'Songwriter of the Year' and in 2010 he had a second UK number 1 with the Diana Vickers single "Once", a song he wrote with Cathy Dennis. White started his own record label in 2009.

Biography
Eg White started his career in the band Yip Yip Coyote and then formed Brother Beyond with his brother, David White, in the late 1980s, leaving the latter when they became involved with the songwriting team of Stock, Aitken and Waterman, just prior to their chart successes.

In 1990, Eg White collaborated with London model and BMX champion Alice Temple to record the critically acclaimed pop album 24 Years of Hunger, which was released in 1991 under the name  and Alice and failed to chart. Lack of commercial success did not deter the taste-makers, however, and 24 Years of Hunger was described by Allmusic as "one of the finest, most refined and fully realized recordings of the era, employing a much more sophisticated and romantic style than anything else out of England at the time".

In 1992, White produced the debut, self-titled album by Kinky Machine, then disappeared from the music industry until 1996 when he released his debut solo album Turn Me On, I'm a Rocket Man, which was unsuccessful.

He turned to songwriting in 1997, providing instrumentation for the sessions of Suggs' solo album The Three Pyramids Club, but it was in 1999 that his career began to take off as he became a songwriter, musician and producer in hot demand. His collaborative relationship with Alice Temple continued, the results of which can be heard on her solo debut album Hang Over. He also worked with Icelandic-Italian singer Emiliana Torrini on her debut album Love in the Time of Science and produced British singer-songwriter Mark Abis' album Changing Inside.

White's song "Leave Right Now" was recorded by Will Young in 2003, and reached number 1 in the UK Singles Chart. In recognition, White won the Ivor Novello Award for Best Song Musically and Lyrically in 2004. He has since enjoyed enduring chart success with acts including Duffy, James Morrison and Joss Stone.

In 2008, White worked with Adele on three tracks which appeared on her first album 19, including the second single "Chasing Pavements". White is known in the industry for his pace of work and ability to reach the core of the intent of the artist he is working with, saying "Sometimes I get two hours. Someone comes over at three, we have a cup of tea, chew the cud for a bit, go: 'All right, shall we write a song?' And by six, they've gone home and we've...done it. Chasing Pavements, that took two or three hours."

In 2009, White was awarded his second Ivor Novello Award for 'Songwriter of the Year', and in 2010 he had a second UK number 1 with the Diana Vickers single "Once", a song he wrote with Cathy Dennis. Also in 2010, White reprised his collaborative role with Adele, and with her wrote "Take It All", which appears on her number one album 21.

White started his own record label imprint, Spilt Milk Records, in 2009 – making Lauren Pritchard its first signing, and then signing an exclusive license deal with Island Records to release the album Wasted in Jackson in 2010.  The album features collaborations with White, Ed Harcourt and Marcus Mumford (of the band Mumford & Sons). He signed a recording contract with Parlophone Records and released a second album entitled Adventure Man on 18 May 2009.  The instrumental version of the lead single, "Broken" was used as the incidental music to the BMW PGA Championship 2009 and played during the closing credits of BBC's coverage of England's final game in the 2010 World Cup in South Africa.

White has worked with Adele, Kylie Minogue, Lennon Stella, Natalie Imbruglia, Florence and the Machine, Dua Lipa, Tom Odell, Sam Smith, Will Young, James Morrison, Linkin Park, Pink, Joss Stone, Matt Cardle, Maverick Sabre and Rebecca Ferguson.

Songwriting and production

Awards and nominations

Eg and Alice - discography
Singles
"Indian" c/w "Crosstown and Bobby and Holly" (WEA Records 1991) - did not chart
"Doesn't Mean That Much to Me" (WEA Records 1991) - did not chart

Album
24 Years of Hunger (WEA Records 1991) - did not chart

Solo discography

Singles
1996: "Stay Home" (Andy Sturmer)
1997: "Made My Baby Cry" (Warner Elektra Atlantic)
2006: "Broken" (Ricky Ross) (Parlophone Records Ltd.)
2015: "You Fooled Me" (Lakeshore Records)

Albums
Turn Me On, I'm a Rocket Man (WEA Records, 1996)
Track listing
"Nothing Comes Easy"
"Made My Baby Cry"
"What Can I Do"
"Stay Home"
"Mr Cool"
"Do It for Myself"
"Sister Blue"
"Holding It In"
"I Wish You Could Be Happy Too"
"Angel"
"My Lovely Valentine"

Adventure Man (Spilt Milk Records 2009)
Track Listing
"But California" (Eg White)
"Weird Friendless Kid" (Eg White, Louis Eliot)
"My People" (Eg White)
"'Til The End" (Eg White, Aret Komlosy)
"Pay Later" (Eg White, Neil Hannon)
"Broken" (Eg White, Ricky Ross)
"There's Going To Be Someone" (Eg White, Matt Marston)
"Whatever Makes You Sick" (Eg White)
"Time To Fall" (Eg White)
"If You Run" (Eg White, Neil Hannon)
"Pull Me Through" (Eg White, Alice Temple)
"Our Turn Will Come" (Eg White, Jack Hues)

First review found at Daily Music Guide.

References

External links
 Spilt Milk Management

1966 births
Living people
English record producers
English songwriters
English male singers
Ivor Novello Award winners
Brother Beyond members